Addtech AB is a Swedish, publicly listed technical solutions group. Addtech consists of approximately 140 subsidiaries with a total of about 3500 employees. The group is active within  niche markets for high-tech products and solutions. The customers are largely Nordic companies within the manufacturing industry. Addtech has yearly sales of SEK 14 billion and sells to more than 40 countries.

Business areas
Operations are organized in five business areas: Automation, Electrification, Energy, Industrial Solutions and Process Technology.

Market
Addtech’s operational focus is on the Nordic countries, although markets outside the region have grown in importance in recent years. The operations beyond the Nordics are in the UK, Germany, Austria, Switzerland, Poland, Estonia, Latvia, Japan, USA and China. In addition to this, the Group exports to more than 20 other countries.

History
Addtech originates from the company Bergman & Beving, which was founded in 1906 and went public in 1976. The division of operations into business areas, and the combination of decentralization and own responsibility, were already catchwords at the time of Bergman & Beving, and has laid the foundation for the business philosophy of today's Addtech. In 2001, Bergman & Beving divided operations into three independent subsidiaries, each of which is listed on the Nasdaq OMX Stockholm, also called Stockholm Stock Exchange. Three new companies were born; Bergman & Beving (now B&B Tools) Lagercrantz Group, and Addtech. Since Addtech's listing in 2001, more than 100 corporate acquisitions have been made.

References

Companies based in Stockholm
Companies listed on Nasdaq Stockholm
Technology companies of Sweden
Technology companies established in 1906
Swedish companies established in 1906